This list charts the most successful films at cinemas in Australia by box office sales in Australian dollars. An overview of the top-earning films and record-holders is provided, as well as the highest-grossing Australian productions.

Highest-grossing films

The following is a list of the highest-grossing films in Australia. The list is topped by James Cameron's Avatar (2009) which surpassed his Titanic (1997) to take the local record. Crocodile Dundee (1986) is the highest-grossing Australian film with a gross of A$47.7 million.

Background colour  indicates films currently in cinemas

Highest-grossing film by year

Previous record holders

Highest-grossing Australian productions
The following is a list of the highest-grossing Australian films at the Australian box office.

{| class="wikitable sortable"
|-
! Rank !! Title !! Year ofrelease !! Budget(A$) !! Australian gross(A$)!! Worldwide gross(US$)	 
|-
| 1 || Crocodile Dundee || 1986 || $11,500,000 || $47,707,598 || $328,203,506
|-
| 2 || Australia || 2008 || $200,000,000 (US$130,000,000,US$78,000,000 after tax incentives) || $37,555,757 || $211,342,221
|-
| 3 || Babe || 1995 || $30,000,000 || $36,797,861 || $254,134,910
|-
| 4|| style="text-align:left; background: #9fc;"|Elvis|| 2022|| $120,000,000 || $33,486,309 || $285,781,077
|-
| 5 || Happy Feet || 2006 || $132,740,000 || $31,786,593 || $384,335,608
|-
| 6 || The Lego Movie*|| 2014 || $60,000,000 || $29,834,461 || $468,060,692
|-
| 7 || Lion || 2016 || $15,000,000 || $29,563,329 || $140,312,928
|-
| 8 || Moulin Rouge! || 2001 || $52,000,000 || $27,765,415 || $179,213,434
|-
| 9|| The Great Gatsby|| 2013 || $105,000,000 || $27,385,977 || $353,641,895
|-
| 10|| Peter Rabbit || 2018 || $50,000,000 || $26,760,008 || $351,266,433
|-
| colspan="6" | Films marked as * are not classified as Australian by Screen Australia
|}

Previous Australian record holders

Other popular Australian films

High grossing Australian films from earlier decades include:
1900s – The Story of the Kelly Gang (1906) (gross £20,000)
1910s – The Fatal Wedding (1911) (£18,000), The Life Story of John Lee, or The Man They Could Not Hang (1912) (£20,000), The Martyrdom of Nurse Cavell (1915) (£25,000)
1920s – For the Term of His Natural Life (1927) (over £40,000)
1930s – On Our Selection (1932) (£60,000), The Silence of Dean Maitland (1934) (£50,000)
1940s – Forty Thousand Horsemen (1940) (£130,000), Smithy (1946) (over £50,000), The Overlanders (1946) (£250,000), Sons of Matthew (1949)
1950s – Walk Into Paradise (1956)

See also
 Lists of highest-grossing films

Notes

External links
MPDAA Historical Box Office Top 10 Lists
Film Victoria — Australian Films at the Australian Box Office

References 

Australian film-related lists
Australia